The Thomas Smedley House, located on E. 1st North in Paris, Idaho, was built in about 1870 by Thomas Smedley.  It was listed on the National Register of Historic Places in 1982.

History 
Thomas Smedley was a brick-maker, but built his home of wood.  The house was deemed "architecturally significant as a good illustration of the additive approach to house composition which characterized much of Paris' historic building and as an example of the increasing refinement of the component folk forms. The son of the builder indicates that the house was built in three stages: the central hall-and-parlor section, the left wing and then the right wing. The Smedley family arrived in Paris in 1873 and it is likely that the center cabin was their original house, being of similar siding and scale to other early frame cabins in town."

References 

Houses on the National Register of Historic Places in Idaho
Houses completed in 1870
Bear Lake County, Idaho